The women's trampoline gymnastic event at the 2015 Pan American Games was held on July 18 and 19 at the Toronto Coliseum.

Schedule
All times are Eastern Daylight Time (UTC-4).

Results

Qualification

Final

References

Gymnastics at the 2015 Pan American Games
2015 in women's gymnastics